Dale Schroeder (April 8, 1919 – April 12, 2005) was a carpenter from Iowa, United States, who worked 67 years for the same firm. He lived frugally, owning only two pairs of blue jeans: one for work and one for attending church on Sundays. He never married or had children, and his $3 million estate paid for the college education of 33 Iowans.

Schroeder grew up poor and wanted to help people like himself attend college. As a result of his generosity, 33 beneficiaries have graduated from college or university without debt. They include both men and women. Many have trained as medical doctors and teachers. The final beneficiary received the final $80,000 of Schroeder's bequest, graduating as a therapist in 2019.

See also
Albert Lexie
Robert Morin (librarian)
Ronald Read (philanthropist)
Richard Leroy Walters

References

People from Des Moines, Iowa
American carpenters
1919 births
2005 deaths